The sewers of the French capital Paris date back to the year 1370 when the first underground system was constructed under Rue Montmartre. Consecutive French governments enlarged the system to cover the city's population, including expansions under Louis XIV and Napoleon III, and modernisation programs in the 1990s under Mayor Jacques Chirac. The system has featured in popular culture through its existence, including  Victor Hugo's 1862 novel, Les Misérables, and H. L. Humes' 1958 novel The Underground City.

History
Until the Middle Ages, the drinking water in Paris was taken from the river Seine. The wastewater was poured onto fields or unpaved streets, and finally filtered back into the Seine. Around 1200, Phillipe Auguste had the Parisian streets paved, incorporating a drain for wastewater in their middle. In 1370 Hugues Aubriot, a Parisian provost had a vaulted, stone-walled sewer built in the "rue Montmartre". This sewer collected the wastewater and took it to the "Menilmontant brook". However, the wastewater was still drained in the open air.

Under the reign of Louis XIV, a large ring sewer was built on the right bank, and the river Bièvre was used as a sewer for the left bank of the Seine. On at least two occasions in the late 1700s, Paris refused to build an updated water system that scientists had studied. Women were actually carrying water from the river Seine to their residences in buckets. Voltaire wrote about it, saying that they "will not begrudge money for a Comic Opera, but will complain about building aqueducts worthy of Augustus". Louis Pasteur himself lost three children to typhoid. Under Napoleon I, the first Parisian vaulted sewer network was built. It was 30 km long.

In 1855, as a part of his plan to improve the sanitation and traffic circulation in Paris,  Napoleon III ordered the construction of new boulevards, aqueducts and sewers. His prefect for the Seine, Baron Haussmann, and the engineer Eugène Belgrand, designed the present Parisian sewer and water supply networks. Thus was built, more than a century ago, a double water supply network (one for drinking water and one for non drinking water) and a sewer network that was 600 km long in 1878. From 1880 to 1913, efforts were taken to connect Parisian buildings to the sewers (they were most at the time "connected to the city's clean water network and the rest had access to free neighborhood taps (fontaines)"). By 1914, 68% of all buildings in Paris had direct connections to the sewer. Research shows that this contributed to a decline in mortality.

From Belgrand to the present

Belgrand's successors went on extending the Parisian network: from 1914 to 1977, more than 1000 km of new sewers were built.

At the end of World War I, the 50 km² of sewage fields were no longer sufficient to protect the Seine. A general sewage treatment programme, designed to meet the needs for 50 years, was drawn up and became state-approved in 1935: this was the beginning of industrial sewage treatment.

The aim was to carry all the Parisian wastewater to the Achères treatment plant using a network of effluent channels. Since then, the Achères plant has continued to grow. At the end of 1970, it was one of the biggest sewage treatment plants in Europe. Its actual capacity is more than 2 million cubic metres per day.

This programme has been gradually upgraded: modernization of the Achères and Noisy-le-Grand (a small station farther upstream) facilities, construction of a new plant at Valenton, and expansion of the Colombes experimental station.

Modernization now and in the future
The aims of the modernization programme launched by the Mayor of Paris in 1991 were: to protect the Seine from storm overflow pollution by reducing the amount of untreated water discharged directly into the Seine, to reinforce the existing sewers, to enable the network to function better.

This project, which is costing an estimated 152 million euros over the first 5 years, will include:

 the refurbishing of the old sewers in bad condition,
 the renovation of pumping stations,
 the construction of new sewers,
 the installation of measuring devices and automated flow control management,
 the improving of the management of solid waste and grit,
 the development of the computerised network management system.

The sewer in fiction

The sewer system is described in Victor Hugo's 1862 novel, Les Misérables (Part 5, Jean Valjean; Book II, The Intestine of the Leviathan, ch.1, The Land Impoverished by the Sea): "...Paris has another Paris under herself; a Paris of sewers; which has its streets, its crossings, its squares, its blind alleys, its arteries, and its circulation, which is slime, minus the human form", and also appears in a scene near the end of the musical based on the novel.

The sewer system plays a key part in H. L. Humes' 1958 novel, The Underground City. Humes, an American novelist, was a cofounder of the Paris Review.

The sewer features in a section of Max Brook's World War Z. Many people fled to the sewers to escape the dead, but were followed, leaving one of the most dangerous campaigns of the "war".

In the American television show The Honeymooners episode "The Man from Space", broadcast 31 December 1955, sewer worker Ed Norton comes in dressed as an 18th-century fop, and announces that he will win the Raccoon lodge costume ball because he is dressed as "Pierre Francois de la Brioski, designer of the Paris sewers." Norton later corrected himself and said he found out that Brioski was the man who "condemned the Paris sewers."

Museum

The Paris Sewer Museum, is dedicated to the sewer system of Paris. Tours of the sewage system have been popular since the 1800s and are currently conducted at the sewers. Visitors are able to walk upon raised walkways directly above the sewage itself. The entrance is near the Pont de l'Alma.

See also
 List of museums in Paris
 Catacombs of Paris

References

Bibliography
Donald Reid (1991) Paris Sewers and Sewermen: Realities and Representations, Harvard University Press.

External links
 

1370 establishments in Europe
1370s establishments in France
Sewerage infrastructure
Water supply and sanitation in France
History of Paris
Buildings and structures in Paris